Dounreay is a small settlement and the site of two large nuclear establishments on the north coast of Caithness in the Highland area of Scotland.

The nuclear establishments were created in the 1950s. They were the Nuclear Power Development Establishment (NPDE) for the development of civil fast breeder reactors, and the Vulcan Naval Reactor Test Establishment (NRTE), a military submarine reactor testing facility. Both these no longer perform their original research functions and will be completely decommissioned, some of which has been in progress for a while. The two establishments have been a major element in the economy of Thurso and Caithness, but this will decrease with the progress of decommissioning.

The NPDE will enter an interim care and surveillance state by 2036, and become a brownfield site by 2336. An announcement in July 2020 that the Nuclear Decommissioning Authority (NDA) will be taking over direct management of the site from the site licence company Dounreay Site Restoration Limited (DSRL) in 2021 has alleviated fears of 560 job losses.

The NRTE is to be decommissioned under a ten-year contract starting in 2023, ending in the creation of a brownfield site, which would be transferred to the NDA.

Dounreay settlement
Dounreay is the site of Dounreay Castle (now a ruin) and its name derives from the Gaelic for 'fort on a mound'. Dounreay was the site of the battle of Sandside Chase in 1437. Robert Gordon's map of Caithness, 1642, uses Dounrae as the name of the castle. William J. Watson's The Celtic Place-names of Scotland gives the origin as Dúnrath, possibly a reference to a broch.

Dounreay was the site of a World War II airfield, called RAF Dounreay. It became HMS Tern (II) in 1944 when the airfield was transferred to the Admiralty from RAF Coastal Command as a satellite of HMS Tern at Twatt in Orkney. It never saw any action during the war and was placed into care and maintenance in 1949.

Nuclear sites
There are two nuclear sites at Lower Dounreay built on and around the site of the former airfield. The Nuclear Power Development Establishment site is owned by the Nuclear Decommissioning Authority (NDA) but was previously owned and run by the United Kingdom Atomic Energy Authority. Adjacent to this site is the Ministry of Defence Vulcan Naval Reactor Test Establishment. The two sites are best known for their five nuclear reactors, three formerly owned and operated by the UKAEA  and two by the Ministry of Defence.

During the 1980s and 1990s, a visitor centre was opened in the former air traffic control tower.  Visitors would be taken by bus to the PFR building where anything electronic, including watches and cameras, would be stored away securely until return. White coats were worn along with radiation badges. A guided tour through the air lock into the reactor building was then conducted, walking around the reactor core and then returning via scientists working behind thick mineral glass screens.

Dounreay Nuclear Power Development Establishment

Dounreay Nuclear Power Development Establishment was formed in 1955 primarily to pursue the UK Government policy of developing civil fast breeder reactor (FBR) technology. The site was operated by the United Kingdom Atomic Energy Authority (UKAEA). Three nuclear reactors were built there by the UKAEA, first a materials test reactor, then two fast breeder reactor prototypes. There were also fabrication and reprocessing facilities for the materials test rigs and for fuel for the FBRs.

Dounreay was chosen as the reactor location, remote from large centres of population, for safety reasons. The site has been managed by the site licence Dounreay Site Restoration Ltd (DSRL) since 2012, but the NDA will assume complete control when DSRL becomes a wholly owned subsidiary of the NDA in March 2021.

Dounreay Materials Test Reactor

The first of the Dounreay reactors to achieve criticality was the Dounreay Materials Test Reactor (DMTR) in May 1958, which was a DIDO class research reactor, producing a high neutron flux. 
This reactor was used to test the performance of materials under intense neutron irradiation, particularly those intended for fuel cladding and other structural uses in a fast neutron reactor core. Test pieces were encased in uranium-bearing alloy to increase the already high neutron flux of this class of reactor, and then chemically stripped of this coating after irradiation. DMTR was closed in 1969 when materials testing work was consolidated at Harwell Laboratory.

Dounreay Fast Reactor
The second operational reactor (although the first to commence construction) was the Dounreay Fast Reactor (DFR), which achieved criticality on 14 November 1959. Power was exported to the National Grid from 14 October 1962 until the reactor was taken offline for decommissioning in March 1977. During its operational lifespan, DFR produced over 600millionkWh of electricity.

DFR and associated facilities cost £15million to build in late 1950s money (equivalent to £370million in 2021). It was designed to generate 60MW thermal power and achieve a 2% fuel burn up. It reached 30MWt in August 1962, and 60MWt in July 1963 allowing it to produce its rated 14MWe (electrical). The reactor was surrounded by a  steel sphere, still a prominent feature of the landscape, which was constructed by the Motherwell Bridge Company.

DFR was a loop-type FBR cooled by primary and secondary NaK circuits, with 24 primary coolant loops. The reactor core was initially fuelled with uranium metal fuel stabilised with molybdenum and clad in niobium. The core was later used to test oxide fuels for PFR and provide experimental space to support overseas fast reactor fuel and materials development programmes.

It had over 5,000 breeder elements of natural uranium in stainless steel arranged in an inner and outer breeder sections.  Many were replaced in 1965.

Prototype Fast Reactor (PFR)
The third and final UKAEA-operated reactor to be built on the Dounreay site was the Prototype Fast Reactor (PFR). In 1966, it was announced that the PFR would be built at Dounreay. PFR was a pool-type fast breeder reactor, cooled by 1,500tonnes of liquid sodium and fueled with MOX. The design output of PFR was 250MWe (electrical).

It achieved criticality in 1974 and began supplying National Grid power in January 1975. There were many delays and reliability problems before reaching full power. It had three cooling circuits. Leaks in the sodium water steam generators shutdown one and then two of the cooling circuits in 1974 and 1975. By August 1976 it had reached 500MWt, (to produce about 166 MWe) and in 1985 it first reached its design output of 250MWe.

In 1988, it was announced that funding for FBR research was being cut from £105million to £10million per year, and the PFR funding would end in 1994.

The reactor was taken offline in 1994, marking the end of nuclear power generation at the site. It had supplied 9,250GWh in all.  The lifetime load factor recorded by the IAEA was 26.9%. The control panel for the reactor was earmarked for an exhibition on the reactor at the London Science Museum in 2016.

Subsequent activity
Since the reactors have all been shut down, care and maintenance of old plant and decommissioning activities have meant that Dounreay has still retained a large workforce. Commercial reprocessing of spent nuclear fuel and waste on the Dounreay site was stopped by the UK government in 1998 although some waste is still accepted from other nuclear facilities in special circumstances.

Significant accidents

Sodium explosion
On 10 May 1977, seawater, which flooded the shaft, reacted violently with the sodium and potassium, throwing off the massive steel and concrete lids of the shaft. This explosion littered the area with radioactive particles.

Radioactive fuel swarf
Tens of thousands of fragments of radioactive fuel escaped the plant between 1963 and 1984, resulting in fishing being banned within  of the plant since 1997. These milled shards are thought to have washed into the sea as cooling ponds were drained. 
, over 2,300 radioactive particles had been recovered from the sea floor, and over 480 from the beaches. 
 the 2km ban on harvesting seafood was still in place, but there were no other restrictions.

Major power failure
Following an incident in May 1998, where a mechanical digger cut through a main power cable and interrupted the site's main and back-up electricity supplies for 16 hours, operations were halted in the Fuel Cycle Area (FCA) and a safety audit of the plant was undertaken by the UK Health and Safety Executive and the Scottish Environment Protection Agency. In September 1998, the highly critical report was published and made 143 recommendations for improvement.

The main points of concern were:
 Weak management and technical base due to organisational changes
 Over-dependence on contractors
 No comprehensive strategy for waste disposal.
 Lack of progress with decommissioning
 Lack of integration of decommissioning and waste strategies
 Poor physical condition of plant
 Scope of rapid reporting was too narrow
 Failure to work to the standards required of a modern nuclear licensee.

The final report in 2001 on the audit noted that the UKAEA had responded satisfactorily to 89 recommendations, and the remaining 54 would be responded to in the medium to long term.
In November 1998, in the report Dounreay - The way ahead, the UKAEA announced a proposed timetable for accelerated decommissioning, reducing the original schedule from 100years to 60years. The cost was initially estimated at £4.3billion.
An accelerated decommissioning plan was welcomed by the Friends of the Earth Scotland, but the environmental group remained opposed to further fuel reprocessing at the site.

Removal of fuel
Following the 1998 report, the Department of Trade and Industry was presented with three options for dealing with 25tonnes of radioactive reactor fuel at Dounreay. The options were:
to reprocess it at Dounreay,
to reprocess some at Dounreay and some at Sellafield, or
to store it above ground at Dounreay.
A plan was eventually devised to remove irradiated and unirradiated fuel to the Sellafield nuclear site, starting in 2014. In 2018, the NDA reported that it would be completed in 2018/2019.

Nuclear Decommissioning Authority ownership
On 1 April 2005, the Nuclear Decommissioning Authority (NDA) became the owner of the site, with the UKAEA remaining as operator. Decommissioning of Dounreay was initially planned to bring the site to an interim care and surveillance state by 2036, and as a brownfield site by 2336, at a total cost of £2.9billion.

A new company called Dounreay Site Restoration Limited (DSRL) was formed as a subsidiary of the United Kingdom Atomic Energy Authority (UKAEA) to handle the decommissioning process. By May 2008, decommissioning cost estimates had been revised. Removal of all waste from the site was expected to take until the late 2070s to complete and the end-point of the project was scheduled for 2300.

Apart from decommissioning the reactors, reprocessing plant, and associated facilities, there were five main environmental issues to be dealt with:
 A   shaft used for intermediate level nuclear waste disposal was contaminating groundwater, and would be threatened by coastal erosion in about 300years. The shaft was never designed as a waste depository, but was used as such on a very ad hoc and poorly monitored basis, without reliable waste disposal records being kept. It was originally used to construct a tunnel for the sea discharge pipe. Later use of the shaft as a convenient waste depository had resulted in one hydrogen gas explosion caused by sodium and potassium wastes reacting with water. At one time it was normal for workers to fire rifles into the shaft to sink polythene bags floating on water.
 Irradiated nuclear fuel particles on the seabed near the plant, estimated to be about several hundreds of thousands in number, caused by old fuel rod fragments being pumped into the sea. The beach had been closed since 1983 due to this.  In 2008, a clean-up project using Geiger counter-fitted robot submarines was planned  to search out and retrieve each particle individually. Particles were still being washed ashore at Sandside Bay beach and one particle at a popular tourist beach at Dunnet in 2006. In 2012, a two million becquerel particle was found at Sandside beach, twice as radioactive as any particle previously found.

Historically, much of Dounreay's nuclear waste management was poor. On 18 September 2006, Norman Harrison, acting chief operating officer, predicted that more problems will be encountered from old practices at the site as the decommissioning effort continues. Some parts of the plant are being entered for the first time in 50years.

In 2007, UKAEA pleaded guilty to four charges under the Radioactive Substances Act 1960 relating to activities between 1963 and 1984, one of disposing of radioactive waste at a landfill site at the plant between 1963 and 1975, and three of illegally dumping radioactive waste and releasing nuclear fuel particles into the sea, resulting in a fine of £140,000.

In 2007 a new decommissioning plan was agreed, with a schedule of 25years and a cost of £2.9billion, a year later revised to 17years at a cost of £2.6billion.

Due to the uranium and plutonium held at the site, it is considered a security risk and there is a high police presence.

In 2013, the detail design of the major project to decommission the intermediate level waste shaft was completed, and work was to begin later in the year. The work would include the recovery and packaging of over 1,500tonnes of radioactive waste. 
, the "interim end state" planned date had been brought forward to 2022–2025. In March 2014, firefighters extinguished a small fire in an area used to store low-level nuclear waste.

On 7 October 2014, a fire on the PFR site led to a "release of radioactivity via an unauthorised route". The Office for Nuclear Regulation (ONR) concluded that "procedural non-compliances and behavioural practices" led to the fire, and served an improvement notice on Dounreay Site Restoration Limited. In 2015 decommissioning staff expressed a lack of confidence in management at the plant and fear for their safety.

In 2016, the task of dismantling the PFR core commenced.

On 7 June 2019, there was a low-level radioactive contamination incident that led to the evacuation of the site. A DSRL spokesman said: "There was no risk to members of the public, no increased risk to the workforce and no release to the environment".

On 23 December 2019, the NDA announced completion of the transfer of all plutonium from Dounreay to Sellafield, where all significant UK stocks of plutonium are now held.

On 20 August 2020, a new date for the site to become available for other uses was announced of 2333, as part of a new draft strategy for reclamation.

Framework contracts
In April 2019, Dounreay Site Restoration Limited (DSRL) awarded six framework contracts for decommissioning services at Dounreay.  The total value of these contracts is estimated to be £400million.

Vulcan Nuclear Reactor Testing Establishment (NRTE)

The Vulcan Naval Reactor Test Establishment (NRTE) (formerly HMS Vulcan) is a Ministry of Defence (MoD) establishment housing the prototype nuclear propulsion plants of the type operated by the Royal Navy in its submarine fleet. Originally it was known as the Admiralty Reactor Test Establishment (ARTE).

For over 40years Vulcan has been the cornerstone of the Royal Navy's nuclear propulsion programme, testing and proving the operation of five generations of reactor core. Its reactors have significantly led the operational submarine plants in terms of operation hours, proving systems, procedures and safety. The reactors were run at higher levels of intensity than those on submarines with the intention of discovering any system problems before they might be encountered on board submarines.

Rolls-Royce, which designs and procures all the reactor plants for the Royal Navy from its Derby offices, operates Vulcan on behalf of the MoD and employs around 280 staff there, led by a small team of staff from the Royal Navy. Reactors developed include the PWR1 and PWR2.

In 2011, the MoD stated that NRTE could be scaled down or closed after 2015 when the current series of tests ends. Computer modelling and confidence in new reactor designs meant testing would no longer be necessary. The cost of decommissioning NRTE facilities when they become redundant, including nuclear waste disposal, was estimated at £2.1billion in 2005. Its final reactor shut down on 21 July 2015, with post operational work continuing to 2022.

In March 2020, it was reported that tenders were being issued to decontaminate and dismantle the reactor complex under a ten-year contract, ending in the creation of a "brownfield" site, which would be transferred to the Nuclear Decommissioning Authority. This decommissioning programme would start in 2023, following the removal of all fuel to the NDA Sellafield site.

Dounreay Submarine Prototype 1 (DSMP1)
The first reactor, PWR1, is known as Dounreay Submarine Prototype 1 (DSMP1). The reactor plant was recognised by the Royal Navy as one of Her Majesty's Submarines (HMS) and was commissioned as HMS Vulcan in 1963. It went critical in 1965. HMS Vulcan is a Rolls-Royce PWR 1 reactor plant and tested Cores A, B and Z before being shut down in 1984. In 1987, the plant was re-commissioned as LAIRD (Loss of Coolant Accident Investigation Rig Dounreay) a non-nuclear test rig, the only one of its kind in the world. LAIRD trials simulated loss of coolant accidents to prove the effectiveness of systems designed to protect the reactor in loss-of-coolant accidents.

Shore Test Facility (STF)
The second reactor, PWR2, is housed in the Shore Test Facility (STF), was commissioned in 1987, and went critical with Core G the same year. The plant was shut down in 1996, and work began to refit the plant with the current core, Core H, in February 1997. This work was completed in 2000 and after two years of safety justification the plant went critical in 2002. Vulcan Trials Operation and Maintenance (VTOM) (the programme under which Core H is tested) was completed and the reactor shut down on 21 July 2015. The reactor will be de-fuelled and examined, and post operational work will continue to 2022. The site would then be decommissioned along with facilities at neighbouring UKAEA Dounreay.

In January 2012, radiation was detected in the reactor's coolant water, caused by a microscopic breach in fuel cladding. This discovery led to  being scheduled to be refuelled and contingency measures being applied to other Vanguard and Astute-class submarines, at a cost of £270million, before similar problems might arise on the submarines. This was not revealed to the public until 2014.

See also

 Nuclear power in Scotland
Atomic Energy Research Establishment
Nuclear power in the United Kingdom
Energy policy of the United Kingdom
Energy use and conservation in the United Kingdom
RAF Dounreay

References

External links

Dounreay Site Restoration, official website
Dounreay - Future Plans, NDA
Shore Based Testing, Rolls-Royce Marine
Vulcan leads the way for Navy nuclear reactors, Navy News, 7 January 2003
Vulcan takes on additional role, Navy News, 4 February 2003
Dounreay, Scottish Parliament research note, 9 January 2001
Dounreay - Fast Breeder, Caithness.Org
The Dounreay Sphere - Design and Construction (video - 25min 11sec), UKAEA, Dounreay TV
The Building of the Prototype Fast Reactor (video - 23min 44sec), UKAEA, Dounreay TV
Dounreay Decommissioning Tasks, UKAEA, December 2005
Dounreay shaft grout to start, Edmund Nuttall, January 2007
Latest reports on monitoring of beaches near Dounreay. Regularly updated
Dounreay Particles Advisory Group: 3rd Report, SEPA, November 2006
Seabed robot seeks Dounreay pollution, Nuclear Engineering International, 3 October 2007

Caithness
Castles in Highland (council area)
Buildings and structures in Highland (council area)
Former nuclear power stations in Scotland
Former nuclear research institutes
Liquid metal fast reactors
Nuclear research institutes in the United Kingdom